Noukadubi (Boat wreck) is a Bengali novel written by Rabindranath Tagore in 1906. The novel was first published in Bangadarshan, a Bengali literary magazine which was under the editorship of Rabindranath himself at that moment.

Characters 
The characters of this novel are:
 Ramesh
 Hemanlini
 Kamala
 Nalinaksha
 Annadababu
 Yogendra
 Akshay
 Umesh
 Chakravarti
 Shailaja

Adaptations
 Milan
 Ghunghat
Noukadubi
 Noukadubi
Mathar Kula Manickam
Charana Daasi
Oka Chinna Maata

References

External links 
 https://www.goodreads.com/book/show/23110390
 rabindra-rachanabali.nltr.org

Novels by Rabindranath Tagore
1906 novels
Indian novels adapted into films